The 2010 Claxton Shield was the 76th Claxton Shield tournament, the premier baseball competition in Australia, and was held from 6 November 2009 to 7 February 2010. It was hailed as the precursor to the new Australian Baseball League that will start in the place of the Claxton Shield in late 2010 to early 2011. The Victoria Aces defeated South Australia two games to nil in the championship series to win the tournament; this was the 22nd time the Claxton Shield had been awarded to a Victorian team. The competition was sponsored by Domino's Pizza.

At the conclusion of the regular season, the Victoria Aces finished in first place with a 17–7 record, earning home-field advantage for the three-game championship series. South Australia hosted the three-game semi-final series against the New South Wales Patriots. Both teams finished with a 14–10 record. The Perth Heat (12–12) and Queensland Rams (3–21) both failed to qualify for the finals.

Overview 

In June 2009, it was announced that the rights to the Claxton Shield had been sold to a new Australian Baseball League (ABL), with ownership split between Major League Baseball's 75 percent share and the 25 percent share owned by the Australian Baseball Federation. The 2010 tournament was considered preparation for the inaugural ABL season starting in 2010–11. It varied from the 2009 Claxton Shield by expanding the season to include ten rounds. Since an uneven number (five) teams were involved, four teams paired off for each round and played a three-game series, while the remaining team took a bye. During the season, each team had two bye rounds and played two rounds against each other team, one at home and one away. In total, the schedule allowed for 24 regular-season games per team before a postseason similar to the 2009 edition: the first-place  team directly qualified for the championship series and played against the winner of a playoff series between the second- and third-place teams.

During the regular season, games were played on a Friday night and a doubleheader on Saturday; in each doubleheader one of the two games was shortened to seven innings. The exception to this was when Perth played their home games; they played on a Thursday night instead of a doubleheader on Saturday. Each postseason series was scheduled for a Friday, Saturday and Sunday.

Teams

Rosters 

The 2010 series allowed each team to make use of a 19-man active roster. Exceptions were made in two cases that allowed teams' active rosters to expand to 21 players, both times for the same reason. Two games during the season had to be postponed because of poor weather. Both games involved teams meeting for the first time during the season; make-up games were scheduled at the start of the return series between the teams, and this resulted in two four-game series. In both cases, the teams had a 19-man roster for the make-up game, and an expanded 21-man roster for the originally scheduled series.

Venues 
The 2010 Claxton Shield was contested between five teams from around Australia. In previous years, many of the teams had played their home games at multiple venues. This season each team held their home games at only one venue. There was one scheduled exception to this at the start of the season: the New South Wales Patriots' final home series against the Perth Heat was held at Gilchrist Oval, whereas all of their other home games were held at Blacktown Baseball Stadium.

As a result of poor attendance at Geelong Baseball Park, game one of the fifth-round series between New South Wales and the Victoria Aces was moved to La Trobe University, Melbourne. Although the Geelong games had attracted crowds of no more than 500, the moved game had an attendance of 2,200. Though no further regular season games were moved, the finals series hosted by the Aces was held at La Trobe University as well.

The venues are as follows:

Regular season 
The regular season was held from 6 November 2009 through to 23 January 2010. All five teams competed in a double round-robin format; playing each other team in two series of three games each, totaling 24 games played each. The top three teams progressed to the finals series. The top team automatically qualified for the championship series, to face the winner of the semi final series between the second and third placed teams.

The Queensland Rams were the first team to be eliminated from contention for the finals, after being swept four games to nil by the Victoria Aces in round 8. The following round saw South Australia clinch a position in the finals, despite finishing the round in second position. It was not until the final round that the last two spots in the finals were decided: the Aces clinched top spot by sweeping the Perth Heat, which combined with the New South Wales Patriots sweep of the Rams eliminated Perth from contention and secured the last finals spot for the Patriots.

Standings

Round 1 
The New South Wales Patriots and the Victoria Aces hosted the opening round of the 2010 Claxton Shield, against the Queensland Rams and the Perth Heat respectively. New South Wales overcame a loss in their first game to take both games in the doubleheader, while Victoria had a first up win, then split their double header with Perth.

*—Scheduled as a 7–inning game

Round 2 
The Perth Heat hosted their first series of the competition, winning their series against the New South Wales Patriots two games to one. South Australia had their first games of the season, hosting and sweeping the Queensland Rams three–nil. The second game of both series featured the first extra innings games of the season, with the respective home teams winning both matches.

As a result of their sweep, South Australia (3–0) took the outright lead of the competition, leaving Victoria (2–1) in second, New South Wales and Perth (3–3) tied, and Queensland (1–5) in last position.

*—Scheduled as a 7–inning game

Round 3 
The Queensland Rams hosted the Perth Heat, while South Australia travelled to Geelong to face the Victoria Aces. After winning the opening game, Queensland (2–7) dropped both games of the doubleheader to fall further behind the rest of the field. With Perth's (5–4) series win, they moved ahead of New South Wales (3–3) into outright third.

South Australia (4–1) and Victoria (3–2) split their series. The final game of their doubleheader suspended in the bottom of the second due to rain with South Australia leading 2–0. At the time the game administrators considered continuing the game from the point of suspension when the teams next met in Round 9, though the game was actually restarted and eventually won by South Australia.

*—Scheduled as a 7–inning game

Round 4 
South Australia, closely followed by New South Wales, had the first games called prior to their scheduled end due to a mercy rule. South Australia's 10–run win helped to set up their series win against Queensland in Brisbane, while the Patriot's 13–run win over Victoria snapped a 3–game losing streak and was the significant part of the 20 runs they scored in the two games for the day.

South Australia (6–2) extended their tournament lead to a game and a half over New South Wales and Perth (5–4), once again tied. Victoria (4–4) fell to fourth, while Queensland (3–9) remained in last.

*—Scheduled as a 7–inning game

Round 5 
As a result of poor attendance at Geelong Baseball Park, game one of the fifth round series between New South Wales and the Victoria was moved to La Trobe University, Melbourne. Having previously attracted crowds of no more than 500, the moved game had an attendance of 2,200, which the home team won 3–2. The series concluded in a doubleheader at Geelong, split between the two teams, giving the Aces the series win. Despite winning the series at Norwood Oval, South Australia suffered their first defeat at home, losing to Perth in the second game of the series.

At the end of the round, South Australia (8–3) held a two-game lead over Victoria (6–5). New South Wales and Perth (6–6) remained tied, having dropped to third place, while Queensland (3–9) remained in last position.

*—Scheduled as a 7–inning game

Round 6 
For the second time in the season, the Queensland were swept in a series this time by the Heat at Baseball Park. The Patriots hosted South Australia, and after dropping the first game won both games in the doubleheader to win the series, and inflict their first series loss of the season.

Despite their series loss, South Australia (9–5) remained in first place. Perth (9–6) moved to second place on the back of their sweep, only one half game behind. Victoria (6–5) dropped to third without playing a game. New South Wales (8–7) fell to fourth, while Queensland (3–12) remained in last place.

*—Scheduled as a 7–inning game

Round 7 

*—Scheduled as a 7–inning game

Round 8 

*—Scheduled as a 7–inning game

Round 9 

*—Scheduled as a 7–inning game

Round 10 
Going into the final round, the Perth Heat and the Victoria Aces were the two teams that could have taken first place and assured themselves of a home final. In the first game of their series though, the Aces clinched the top spot, and in doing so made the Patriot's chance of overtaking the Heat and making the finals easier. The following two games saw New South Wales beat Queensland to move them into third position, and Perth drop another game to Victoria to allow South Australia to secure second, and a home semi final series.

The Patriots secured the last remaining finals berth in the first game of their doubleheader, beating the Rams 16–0 and eliminating the Heat from finals contention.

*—Scheduled as a 7–inning game

Statistical leaders

Finals series 

The 2010 Claxton Shield made use of the same finals structure as had been used in the 2009 season. The top three teams at the conclusion of the ten rounds of regular-season games qualified. The second- and third-place teams faced in each other in a best-of-three series hosted by the second-place team. The winner of that series then faced the first-place team for a best-of-three series. South Australia hosted the New South Wales Patriots at Norwood Oval, Adelaide, while the Victoria Aces hosted the championship series at La Trobe University, Melbourne. In the finals, the home team and away team alternated during each of the series. As a result, South Australia was officially the away team for game two of its series against New South Wales, as was Victoria in the championship series.

After defeating the Patriots two games to one in the semi-final series, South Australia progressed to the championship series against the Aces. There they were defeated two games to nil. After game two of the championship series, Victoria's Matthew Blackmore was named both Claxton Shield Final Series MVP and Pitcher of the Year.

Semi-final series

Championship series

Awards 
At the conclusion of the finals series, the winner of two awards were announced. Matthew Blackmore won both the Pitcher of the Year award and the Finals Series MVP award. At the Baseball Australia Diamond Awards, held on 6 March at the Hotel Grand Chancellor, Adelaide, Wayne Lundgren was announced as the 35th winner of the Helms Award; the Claxton Shield's Most Valuable Player award. Lundgren was the first pitcher to win since 1986. Runners-up by two votes were Paul Mildren and Michael Collins.

References

External links 
2010 Claxton Shield – Official Tournament Website
Official Baseball Australia Website

 
January 2010 sports events in Australia
February 2010 sports events in Australia
November 2009 sports events in Australia
December 2009 sports events in Australia
Claxton Shield